The 2023 Scotties Tournament of Hearts, Canada's national women's curling championship, was held from February 17 to 26 at the Sandman Centre in Kamloops, British Columbia. The winning Kerri Einarson team will represent Canada at the 2023 World Women's Curling Championship at the Göransson Arena in Sandviken, Sweden.

The defending champion Kerri Einarson rink, representing Team Canada, defeated Team Manitoba, skipped by Jennifer Jones in the final, 10–4. It was the fourth straight championship for the Einarson team, becoming only the second team ever to win four straight Tournament of Hearts (Colleen Jones' rink won from 2001 to 2004 inclusively). In the final, Team Canada broke a 2–2 tie in the fifth, when they stole two points after Jones' final draw came up light. Manitoba conceded the game after Einarson hit for five in the ninth end.

Skip Kerri Einarson and her team of Val Sweeting, Shannon Birchard and Briane Harris had won the past three editions and are representing Team Canada at the event. The event follows the same format as the past two editions that includes Team Canada, the fourteen Canadian curling member associations and three Wild Card teams that are the top three teams who did not qualify from their provincial playdowns based on CTRS standings.

Teams
The fourteen Canadian curling member associations held playdowns to determine who would represent their province or territory. Team Canada is represented by Team Kerri Einarson, who were the winners of the 2022 Scotties Tournament of Hearts. The three wild card teams were decided by the CTRS standings. The top three teams, who did not already qualify from their playdowns, qualified.

The teams are listed as follows:

CTRS Rankings
As of February 14, 2023

Source:

Wild card selection
In previous years, a wild card game was played between the top two teams on the Canadian Team Ranking System standings who did not win their provincial championship; the winner of this game was usually granted the final spot in the tournament. However, Curling Canada opted to include three wild card teams instead of the usual one. These teams will directly qualify and will not participate in a play-in game. This is the third time this format is being used, with the first two being in 2021 and 2022.

Round robin standings
Final Round Robin Standings

Round robin results

All draw times are listed in Pacific Time (UTC−08:00).

Draw 1
Friday, February 17, 6:00 pm

Draw 2
Saturday, February 18, 1:00 pm

Draw 3
Saturday, February 18, 6:00 pm

Draw 4
Sunday, February 19, 8:30 am

Draw 5
Sunday, February 19, 1:30 pm

Draw 6
Sunday, February 19, 6:30 pm

Draw 7
Monday, February 20, 8:30 am

Draw 8
Monday, February 20, 1:30 pm

Draw 9
Monday, February 20, 6:30 pm

Draw 10
Tuesday, February 21, 8:30 am

Draw 11
Tuesday, February 21, 1:30 pm

Draw 12
Tuesday, February 21, 6:30 pm

Draw 13
Wednesday, February 22, 8:30 am

Draw 14
Wednesday, February 22, 1:30 pm

Draw 15
Wednesday, February 22, 6:30 pm

Draw 16
Thursday, February 23, 8:30 am

Draw 17
Thursday, February 23, 1:30 pm

Draw 18
Thursday, February 23, 6:30 pm

Tiebreakers
Friday, February 24, 8:30 am

Championship round

Semifinals
Friday, February 24, 1:00 pm

Finals
Friday, February 24, 6:00 pm

Playoffs

1 vs. 2
Saturday, February 25, 6:00 pm

3 vs. 4
Saturday, February 25, 1:00 pm

Semifinal
Sunday, February 26, 12:00 pm

Final
Sunday, February 26, 6:00 pm

Statistics

Top 5 player percentages
Final Round Robin Percentages; minimum 6 games

Perfect games

Awards
The awards and all-star teams were as follows:

All-Star Teams

Marj Mitchell Sportsmanship Award
The Marj Mitchell Sportsmanship Award was presented to the player chosen by their fellow peers as the curler that most exemplified sportsmanship and dedication to curling during the annual Scotties Tournament of Hearts.

Sandra Schmirler Most Valuable Player Award
The Sandra Schmirler Most Valuable Player Award was awarded to the top player in the playoff round by members of the media in the Scotties Tournament of Hearts.

Einarson's fourth MVP award set a record for the most playoff MVP awards won by a single player.

In a touching moment following the event, Einarson bestowed the MVP honour to her teammate and lead Briane Harris, who competed in the tournament while being five months pregnant.

Joan Mead Builder Award
The Joan Mead Builder Award recognizes a builder in the sport of curling named in the honour of the late CBC curling producer Joan Mead.
Dianne Barker – umpire at provincial, national, World, and three Olympic curling tournaments, board member of Curl BC and Curling Canada, and a lifetime member of the Kamloops Curling Club.

Paul McLean Award
The Paul McLean Award is presented by TSN to a person behind the scenes who has made a significant contribution to the sport of curling.
Dave Komosky – editor of Curling Canada's Extra End publications and has covered curling for over 50 years from covering numerous Canadian and international championships. He's covered 35 Briers as a reporter for the Winnipeg Tribune, Calgary Herald, Saskatoon Star-Phoenix, and Curling Canada's event newspapers such as the Heart Chart, Tankard Times, and curling.ca.

Provincial and territorial playdowns

 2023 Alberta Scotties Tournament of Hearts: January 18–22
 2023 British Columbia Scotties Tournament of Hearts: January 11–15
 2023 Manitoba Scotties Tournament of Hearts: January 25–29
 2023 New Brunswick Scotties Tournament of Hearts: January 18–22
 2023 Newfoundland and Labrador Scotties Tournament of Hearts: January 26–29
 2023 Northern Ontario Scotties Tournament of Hearts: January 25–29
 2023 Northwest Territories Scotties Tournament of Hearts: January 11–15
 2023 Nova Scotia Scotties Tournament of Hearts: January 26–30
 2023 Nunavut Scotties Tournament of Hearts: December 16–17
 2023 Ontario Scotties Tournament of Hearts: January 23–29
 2023 Prince Edward Island Scotties Tournament of Hearts: January 26–28
 2023 Quebec Scotties Tournament of Hearts: January 10–14
 2023 Saskatchewan Scotties Tournament of Hearts: January 25–29
 2023 Yukon Scotties Tournament of Hearts: Not held

Notes

References

External links

 
Scotties Tournament of Hearts
Curling in British Columbia

Scotties Tournament of Hearts
Sports competitions in British Columbia
Sport in Kamloops